Haley Rae Skarupa (born January 3, 1994) is an American ice hockey player with the PWHPA and the American national team.

Playing career

After graduating from high school, Skarupa joined Boston College, where both her parents had studied. Across four seasons in the NCAA, she scored 244 points in 144 games, the second highest scorer in Boston College history, for both men and women. She was a finalist for the Patty Kazmaier Memorial Award in both 2015 and 2016.

In the 2015 NWHL Draft, she was selected by the New York Riveters of the National Women's Hockey League (NWHL).On April 26, 2016, Skarupa's draft rights were traded to the Connecticut Whale by the Riveters for Michelle Picard.

Across three seasons in the NWHL, Skarupa would put up 45 points in 34 games, being named to the 2017 NWHL All-Star Game.

In May 2019, Skarupa joined the PWHPA boycott of the 2019-20 season. A few months later, she was hired as a hockey ambassador with the Washington Capitals of the NHL.

International 

She participated at the 2015 IIHF Women's World Championship, as well as the 2016 and 2017 World Championships, winning gold each time.

Skarupa played forward for the United States' women's ice hockey team at the 2018 Winter Olympics.

Personal life 

Skarupa was raised in Rockville, Maryland, and she graduated from Wootton High School.

References

External links
 
 
 
 

1994 births
Living people
American women's ice hockey forwards
Boston College Eagles women's ice hockey players
Sportspeople from Rockville, Maryland
Connecticut Whale (PHF) players
Premier Hockey Federation players
Ice hockey people from Maryland
Ice hockey players at the 2018 Winter Olympics
Medalists at the 2018 Winter Olympics
Olympic gold medalists for the United States in ice hockey
Professional Women's Hockey Players Association players